The Pinchgut Creek, a nonperennial stream that is part of the Murrumbidgee catchment within the Murray–Darling basin, is located in the South West Slopes region of New South Wales, Australia.

Course and features 
The Pinchgut Creek (technically a river) rises below Dudauman Range, part of the Great Dividing Range. The creek descends  over its  course.

See also 

 List of rivers of New South Wales (L-Z)
 Rivers of New South Wales

References

External links
Murrumbidgee Catchment Management Authority website
 

Rivers of New South Wales
Tributaries of the Murrumbidgee River
Junee Shire